Zhashui County is a county in the south-central part of Shaanxi province, China.

Administrative divisions
As of 2020, Zhashui County has 1 Subdistricts and 8  Towns and 1 Townships under its administration.
1 subdistrict
 Qianyou

8 towns
 Xingping
 Caoping
 Hongyansi
 Fenghuang
 Xiaoling
 Xialiang
 Yingpan
 Wafangkou

Climate

Transportation
Zhashui is served by the Xi'an–Ankang Railway.

References

County-level divisions of Shaanxi
Shangluo